Race You to the Bottom is the debut studio album by American hard rock band New Medicine, released through Photo Finish Records and Atlantic on September 27, 2010.

Track listing

Personnel
Race You to the Bottom album personnel as listed on Allmusic.

New Medicine
Jake Scherer - vocals / guitar
Matt Brady - bass
Dan Garland - guitar
Ryan Guanzon - drums

Additional musicians
 Tommy Henriksen - programming
 Kevin Kadish - composer, engineer, producer, vocals 
 Sean Gould - bass 
 Jennifer Adan - composer 
 Billy Falcon - composer 
 Karl Owen Gronwall - composer 
 Elisha Hoffman - composer 
 Sam Hollander - composer 
 Rebecca Lynn Howard - composer 
 Zac Maloy - composer 
 Kevin Wayne - composer

Artwork and design
 Mark Obriski – art direction, photography
 Theo Kogan Hair - stylist, make-up 
 Chris Phelps - photography 
 Andrew Zaeh - photography
 Basia Zamorska - stylist

Production and recording
 Jason Livermore - production 
 Colt Leeb - assistant engineering 
 S*A*M - assistant engineering
 Sluggo - assistant engineering 
 Chris Gehringer - mastering 
 David Bendeth - mixing 
 Steve Hodge - mixing, producer 
 James “Fluff” Harley - mixing 
 Anne Declemente - A&R 
 Matt Galle - A&R 
 Mike Marquis - A&R 
 Ryan Harlacher - booking 
 Rebecca Wedlake - booking 
 Anna Jacobson Leong - management 
 John Coster - marketing 
 Gerardo Cueva - marketing 
 David McKay - marketing
 Brian Raney - package production

Chart positions

References

2010 debut albums
New Medicine albums